The Great Red Spot is a persistent high-pressure region in the atmosphere of Jupiter, producing an anticyclonic storm that is the largest in the Solar System. Located 22 degrees south of Jupiter's equator, it produces wind-speeds up to 432 km/h (268 mph). Observations from 1665 to 1713 are believed to be of the same storm; if this is correct, it has existed for at least  years. It was next observed in September 1831, with 60 recorded observations between then and 1878, when continuous observations began.

Observation history

The Great Red Spot may have existed since before 1665, but it could also be the case that the present spot was first seen only in 1830, and well-studied only after a prominent apparition in 1879. The storm that was seen in the 17th century may have been different than the storm that exists today. A long gap separates its period of current study after 1830 from its 17th century discovery. Whether the original spot dissipated and reformed, whether it faded, or if the observational record was simply poor is unknown.

The first sighting of the Great Red Spot is often credited to Robert Hooke, who described a spot on the planet in May 1664. However, it is likely that Hooke's spot was not only in another belt altogether (the North Equatorial Belt, as opposed to the current Great Red Spot's location in the South Equatorial Belt), but also that it was the shadow of a transiting moon, most likely that of Callisto. Far more convincing is Giovanni Cassini's description of a "permanent spot" the following year. With fluctuations in visibility, Cassini's spot was observed from 1665 to 1713, but the 118-year observational gap makes the identity of the two spots inconclusive. The older spot's shorter observational history and slower motion than the modern spot makes it difficult to conclude that they are the same.

A minor mystery concerns a Jovian spot depicted in a 1711 canvas by Donato Creti, which is exhibited in the Vatican. Part of a series of panels in which different (magnified) heavenly bodies serve as backdrops for various Italian scenes, and all overseen by the astronomer Eustachio Manfredi for accuracy, Creti's painting is the first known to depict the Great Red Spot as red (albeit raised to the Jovian Northern hemisphere due to an optical inversion inherent to the era's telescopes). No Jovian feature was explicitly described in writing as red before the late 19th century.

The Great Red Spot has been observed since 5 September 1831. By 1879 over 60 observations were recorded. After it came into prominence in 1879, it has been under continuous observation.

In the 21st century, the Great Red Spot has been observed to be shrinking in size. At the present rate of reduction, it would become circular by 2040. It is not known how long the spot will last, or whether the change is a result of normal fluctuations. In 2019, the Great Red Spot began "flaking" at its edge, with fragments of the storm breaking off and dissipating. The shrinking and "flaking" fueled concern from some astronomers that the Great Red Spot could dissipate within 20 years. However, other astronomers believe that the apparent size of the Great Red Spot reflects its cloud coverage and not the size of the actual, underlying vortex, and they also believe that the flaking events can be explained by interactions with other cyclones or anticyclones, including incomplete absorptions of smaller systems; if this is the case, this would mean that the Great Red Spot is not in danger of dissipating.

A smaller spot, designated Oval BA, formed in March 2000 from the merging of three white ovals, has turned reddish in color. Astronomers have named it the Little Red Spot or Red Jr. As of 5 June 2006, the Great Red Spot and Oval BA appeared to be approaching convergence. The storms pass each other about every two years but the passings of 2002 and 2004 were of little significance. Amy Simon-Miller, of the Goddard Space Flight Center, predicted the storms would have their closest passing on 4 July 2006. She worked with Imke de Pater and Phil Marcus of UC Berkeley and a team of professional astronomers since April 2006 to study the storms using the Hubble Space Telescope; on 20 July 2006, the two storms were photographed passing each other by the Gemini Observatory without converging. In May 2008, a third storm turned red.

The Great Red Spot should not be confused with the Great Dark Spot, a feature observed near the northern pole of Jupiter in 2000 with the Cassini–Huygens spacecraft. There is also a feature in the atmosphere of Neptune also called the Great Dark Spot. The latter feature was imaged by Voyager 2 in 1989 and may have been an atmospheric hole rather than a storm. It was no longer present as of 1994, although a similar spot had appeared farther to the north.

Exploration
The colorful, wavy cloud pattern seen to the left (west) of the Red Spot is a region of extraordinarily complex and variable wave motion.

Over the duration of the Juno mission, the spacecraft continued to study the composition and evolution of Jupiter's atmosphere, especially its Great Red Spot.

Structure
Jupiter's Great Red Spot rotates counterclockwise, with a period of about 4.5 Earth days or 11 Jovian days in 2008. Measuring  in width as of 3 April 2017, Jupiter's Great Red Spot is 1.3 times the diameter of Earth.

Infrared data has long indicated that the Great Red Spot is colder (and thus higher in altitude) than most of the other clouds on the planet. The upper atmosphere above the storm, however, has substantially higher temperatures than the rest of the planet. Acoustic (sound) waves rising from the turbulence of the storm below have been proposed as an explanation for the heating of this region.

Careful tracking of atmospheric features revealed the Great Red Spot's counter-clockwise circulation as far back as 1966, observations dramatically confirmed by the first time-lapse movies from the Voyager fly-bys. The spot is confined by a modest eastward jet stream to its south and a very strong westward one to its north. The rotation period of the spot has decreased with time, perhaps as a direct result of its steady reduction in size.

The Great Red Spot's latitude has been stable for the duration of good observational records, typically varying by about a degree. Its longitude, however, is subject to constant variation, including a 90-day longitudinal oscillation with an amplitude of ~1°. Because Jupiter does not rotate uniformly at all latitudes, astronomers have defined three different systems for defining the longitude. System II is used for latitudes of more than 10 degrees and was originally based on the average rotational period of the Great Red Spot of 9h 55m 42s. Despite this, however, the spot has "lapped" the planet in System II at least 10 times since the early nineteenth century. Its drift rate has changed dramatically over the years and has been linked to the brightness of the South Equatorial Belt and the presence or absence of a South Tropical Disturbance.

Internal depth and structure 
Jupiter's Great Red Spot (GRS) is an elliptical shaped anticyclone, occurring at 22 degrees below the equator, in Jupiter's southern hemisphere. The largest anticyclonic storm (~16,000 km) in our solar system, little is known about its internal depth and structure. Visible imaging and cloud-tracking from in-situ observation determined  the velocity and vorticity of the GRS which is located in a thin anticyclonic ring at 70–85% of the radius and is located along Jupiter's fastest westward moving jet stream. During NASA's 2016 Juno mission, gravity signature and thermal infrareddata was obtained that offered insight into the structural dynamics and depth of the GRS. During July 2017, the Juno spacecraft conducted a second pass of the GRS to collect Microwave Radiometer (MWR) scans of the GRS to determine how far the GRS extended toward the surface of the condensed H2O layer. These MWR scans suggested that the GRS vertical depth extended to about 240 km below the cloud level, with an estimated drop in atmospheric pressure to 100 bar. Two methods of analysis that constrain the data collected were the Mascon approach which found a depth of ~290 km, and the Slepian approach showing wind extending to ~310 km. These methods, along with gravity signature MWR data suggest that the GRS zonal winds still increase at a rate of 50% the velocity of the viable cloud level, before the wind decay starts at lower levels, this rate of wind decay and Gravity data suggest the depth of the GRS is between 200 and 500 km.

Galileo and Cassini's thermal infrared imaging and spectroscopy were conducted of the GRS during 1995–2008, in order to find evidence of thermal inhomogeneities with in the internal structure vortex of the GRS. Previous thermal infrared temperature maps from the Voyager, Galileo, and Cassini missions; suggested the GRS is a cold-core within a upwelling warmer annulus structure of an anticyclonic vortex, this data shows a gradient in the temperature of the GRS. To gain better understanding of Jupiter's atmospheric temperature, aerosol particle opacity, and ammonia gas composition from thermal-IR imaging, a direct correlation of the visible-cloud layers reactions, thermal gradient and compositional mapping to observational data collected over decades. During December 2000, high spatial resolution images from Galileo, of an atmospheric turbulent area to the northwest of the GRS, shows a thermal contrast between the warmest region of the anticyclone with regions to the east and west of the GRS.

The vertical temperature of the structure of the GRS is constrained between the 100–600 mbar range, with the vertical temperature of the GRS core is approximately 400 mbar of pressure, being 1.0–1.5 K, much warmer than regions of the GRS to the east–west, and 3.0–3.5 K warmer than regions to the north–south of the structures edge. This structure is consistent with the data collected by the VISIR (VLT Mid-Infrared Imager Spectrometer on the ESO Very Large Telescope) imaging obtain in 2006, this data revealed that the GRS was physically present in a wide range of altitudes that occur within the 80 - 600 mbar pressure of the atmosphere and confirmers the thermal infrared mapping result. To develop a model of the internal structure of the GRS the Cassini mission Composite Infrared Spectrometer (CIRS) and ground based spatial imaging mapped the composition of the phosphine and ammonia aerosols (PH3, NH3 and para-hydroxybenzoic acid) within the anticyclonic circulation of the GRS. The imaging that was collected form the CIRS and ground-based imaging trace the vertical motion in the Jovian atmosphere by PH3 and NH3 spectra.

The highest concentrations of PH3 and NH3 are found to the north of the GRS peripheral rotation and aided in determine the southward jet movement and shows data of an increase in altitude of the column of aerosols with ranging pressures of  200–500 mbar. However, the NH3 composition data shows that there is a major depletion of NH3 below the visible cloud layer at the southern peripheral ring of the GRS, this lower opacity is relative to a narrow band of atmospheric subsidence. The low mid-IR aerosol opacity along with; the temperature gradients, the altitude difference, and the vertical movement of the zonal winds are involved with the development and sustainability of the vorticity. The stronger atmospheric subsidence and compositional asymmetries of the GRS suggest that the structure exhibits a degree of tilt form the northern edge to the southern edge of the structure. The GRS depth and internal structure has been constant with changes over decades however there is still no logical reason why it is 200–500 km in depth, but the jet streams that supply the force that powers the GRS vortex are well below the structure base.

Color and composition

It is not known what causes the Great Red Spot's reddish color. Hypotheses supported by laboratory experiments suppose that it may be caused by chemical products created from the solar ultraviolet irradiation of ammonium hydrosulfide and the organic compound acetylene, which produces a reddish material—likely complex organic compounds called tholins. The high altitude of the compounds may also contribute to the coloring.

The Great Red Spot varies greatly in hue, from almost brick-red to pale salmon or even white. The spot occasionally disappears, becoming evident only through the Red Spot Hollow, which is its location in the South Equatorial Belt (SEB). Its visibility is apparently coupled to the SEB; when the belt is bright white, the spot tends to be dark, and when it is dark, the spot is usually light. These periods when the spot is dark or light occur at irregular intervals; from 1947 to 1997, the spot was darkest in the periods 1961–1966, 1968–1975, 1989–1990, and 1992–1993.

Mechanical dynamics
The reason the storm has continued to exist for centuries is that there is no planetary surface (only a mantle of hydrogen) to provide friction; circulating gas eddies persist for a very long time in the atmosphere because there is nothing to oppose their angular momentum.

Research suggests that the storm produces extreme amounts of acoustic waves, owing to the turbulence of the storm. This creates a region of upper atmosphere that is —several hundred Kelvin warmer than the rest of the planet at this altitude. The effect is described as being like "crashing [...] ocean waves on a beach".

Gallery

See also

 Extraterrestrial vortex
 Great White Spot, a similar storm on Saturn
 Hypercane
 WISEP J190648.47+401106.8

References

Further reading

External links

 
 
 

 
 Video based on Juno's Perijove 7 overflight by Seán Doran (see album for more)

Jupiter
Planetary spots
Anticyclones
Vortices
Storms
1830 in science